"You're the Voice" is a song written by Andy Qunta, Keith Reid, Maggie Ryder and Chris Thompson, and recorded by the Australian singer John Farnham and released as a single in September 1986 ahead of his album Whispering Jack. "You're the Voice" was one of the biggest hits of 1986 in Australia, topping the Kent Music Report singles chart for seven weeks from 3 November to 21 December. At the ARIA Music Awards of 1987 it won Single of the Year.

The music video was recorded with celebrities (Derryn Hinch and Jacki Weaver) and musicians (James and Vince Leigh of Pseudo Echo, Greg Macainsh), none of whom are on the original audio recording; and were assembled by Farnham's talent manager, Glenn Wheatley. Wheatley later recalled, "[it] was done on a shoestring budget. I called in Derryn and Jacki, some of the guys from Pseudo Echo (James and Vince Leigh) and Greg Macainsh from Skyhooks are in the band, it was pretty much anyone who'd do me a favour."

"You're the Voice" re-entered the Australian singles chart more than 25 years after its original release (reaching No. 64), thanks to its appearance (to advertise the company's SYNC voice control system) in a 2012 Ford TV commercial.

The power ballad is also one of Farnham's biggest successes in Europe, charting at No. 1 in Germany and Sweden and reaching the Top 10 in Austria, Ireland, Switzerland and the UK. Although "You're the Voice" was also successful in Canada (reaching the Top 20), in the US  the track performed relatively poorly, missing the chart on its initial 1987 issue. BMG/RCA re-released the song in the US in February 1990 after Farnham made the Adult Contemporary chart with "Two Strong Hearts". Farnham's version eventually spent eight weeks on the US charts, peaking at No. 82, but in the US the song is probably best known for a charting version issued in 1991 by the band Heart.

In January 2018, as part of Triple M's "Ozzest 100" of the "most Australian' songs of all time", the song was ranked number 6.

Chart history

Weekly charts

Year-end charts

Certifications

Uses in popular culture
The song has been featured in numerous TV and film productions, including the film Hot Rod, the BBC series Merlin, the film Alan Partridge: Alpha Papa and comedian Peter Kay's Car Share, and in the Swedish film Medicinen.

The Australian Electoral Commission has used the song in advertisements surrounding Australian State and Federal elections since 2001.

It is also featured in the original release of Grand Theft Auto: Episodes From Liberty City in in-game radio station Vice City FM, but was removed following the games 10th Year Anniversary.

The song has been used by anti-lockdown protesters who rallied in Melbourne, Victoria during the COVID-19 pandemic. On 21 September 2020, it was reported by Seven News that the song had become a common theme at rallies around the city as Stage 4 lockdowns continue, however, Farnham's manager described it as "offensive" to Farnham and the manager himself.

Heart version 

As a lead promotion for their first live album, Rock the House Live!, in 1991, US rock band Heart released their live version of "You're the Voice" as a single. It was recorded during the US leg of their Brigade world tour in November 1990. Commercially, the single reached No. 20 on the US Billboard Album Rock Tracks chart. In the UK, the single peaked at No. 56. A music video was released that includes footage shot from the tour while coverage of the then-ongoing Gulf War intervene.

The song was released in multiple limited-edition formats in different territories. A studio version of the track had been recorded in late 1989 as part of the sessions for the Brigade album, though it did not make the album track list. This studio version would not see release until July 2000, when it was included on the greatest hits package, Greatest Hits: 1985–1995.

Charts

World Liberty Concert

Chris Thompson had joined Alan Parsons' band for his first solo album after the split of The Alan Parsons Project and was also one of the two frontmen on the ensuing tour, which was captured on the album Alan Parsons Live. For the US release of this album in 1995 (retitled The Very Best Live), the band added three new studio recordings, recorded in February 1995. One of these was "You're the Voice", which marked the first time a version featuring the original songwriter had been released.

"You're the Voice" was then performed at the World Liberty Concert in May 1995 by The Alan Parsons Band, Chris Thompson and Metropole Orkest. The only official release associated with the concert was a single featuring a radio edit of the live version (faded out after four minutes). The B-side was a live recording of "White Dawn", which was performed by the Metropole Orkest and Gelders Opera and Operetta Gezelschap (GOOG) choir. The song was arranged by Andrew Powell and conducted by Dick Bakker. During the performance of "White Dawn", a battle was simulated that included gunfire, which can be heard around the middle of the recording. This track has not been issued on any other release.

Track listing
"You're the Voice (Radio Edit)" – (Qunta, Thompson, Reid, Ryder) – 4:14 Lead Vocals Chris Thompson
"White Dawn" – (Parsons) – 4:50 instrumental

Thompson has continued singing the song live in concert, e.g. with Mandoki Soulmates as recorded on the live album BudaBest as well as recording several more studio versions, e.g. with Mads Eriksen on the album Rediscovery. The original demo by Andy Qunta and Chris Thompson appeared on the deluxe reissue of Qunta's album Legend in a Loungeroom.

Planet Rock Allstars
In November 2019, a single in support of the mental health charity MIND was curated by Planet Rock DJ Wyatt Wendels in conjunction with a 2000-mile charity cycle ride The Road to Rockstock. The limited release CD was then made available from the ride's support vehicle, during late November/early December. The CD features three versions, the main version featuring many well-known rock artists including Alice Cooper, Joe Elliott, Lzzy Hale, Justin Hawkins, Doug Aldrich, Phil Campbell, Bruce Dickinson and Dan Reed. The other versions include the original backing track with Toby Jepson on vocals, and a version with vocals by Joe Elliott. The song will be available as a digital download on 6 December 2019.

Sampling
Farnham's vocals are sampled in a UK hardcore track "You're the Voice" by the artist Waxman, released by record label Raving Mad in 1996 as the A-side of a 12" Vinyl record.

References

1986 songs
1986 singles
1991 singles
1995 singles
ARIA Award-winning songs
John Farnham songs
Heart (band) songs
Rebecca St. James songs
Number-one singles in Australia
Number-one singles in Denmark
Number-one singles in Germany
Number-one singles in Norway
Number-one singles in Sweden
1980s ballads
Pop ballads
Rock ballads
Songs with lyrics by Keith Reid
Songs written by Andy Qunta
Capitol Records singles
CNR Music singles